The Marquette–Joliet Bridge is a bridge crossing the Mississippi River, connecting Marquette, Iowa and Prairie du Chien, Wisconsin. Local residents refer to the bridge as the Prairie Bridge or the Marquette Bridge; both terms are used equally.

The structure is an automobile bridge about three lanes wide, and is designed to accept Jersey barriers for deck service. The bridge carries U.S. Route 18 from Iowa to Wisconsin.

The design of the bridge is a cable-supported tied arch bridge, with the two ends of the arch terminating at abutments located in the middle of the river.

In the winter after its opening, the bridge developed several cracks and had to be closed for repair. In more recent years, the approach on the Iowa side of the bridge was rebuilt as part of the U.S. 18 bypass that was built around Marquette and McGregor, Iowa.

See also 
List of crossings of the Upper Mississippi River

References 

Bridges over the Mississippi River
Bridges completed in 1975
Tied arch bridges in the United States
Road bridges in Iowa
Road bridges in Wisconsin
U.S. Route 18
Bridges of the United States Numbered Highway System
Bridges in Clayton County, Iowa
Interstate vehicle bridges in the United States